Fascia of the urogenital diaphragm may refer to:

 Superior fascia of the urogenital diaphragm
 Inferior fascia of the urogenital diaphragm